Todd Saldana is a retired American soccer midfielder.  He played four seasons in the North American Soccer League, two in the United Soccer League and two in the Western Soccer Alliance.  He was a member of the United States U-20 men's national soccer team the at the 1981 FIFA World Youth Championship and has coached at the collegiate level including three seasons as the head coach of the UCLA Bruins men's soccer team.

Player

Club career
Saldana graduated from South Torrance High School where he was a 1978 Third Team High School All American soccer player.  In 1980, the Los Angeles Aztecs of the North American Soccer League drafted Saldana out of high school.  He played five games for the Aztecs over two seasons before being sent to the San Jose Earthquakes for the 1982 season.  In May 1982, the Earthquakes traded Saldana, two draft choices and cash to the Tulsa Roughnecks in exchange for Joe Morrone, Jr.  He played two outdoor seasons and one indoor season with Tulsa.  In 1984, he signed with the Fort Lauderdale Sun of the United Soccer League. He played twenty-one games and scored three goals as the Sun won the league championship.  In 1985, he returned to the team, now known as the South Florida Sun, but the league collapsed after six games.  In 1987, he played for the Los Angeles Heat of the Western Soccer Alliance.  In 1989, he played for the California Kickers, also of the WSA.

National team
In 1981, Saldana played two games for United States U-20 men's national soccer team the at the 1981 FIFA World Youth Championship.

Coach
From 1989 to 1994, Saldana served as an assistant coach with the UCLA Bruins.  In 1995, he was hired as head coach of Cal Poly Pomona before moving to the Loyola Marymount Lions in 1997 where he had a 6–9–1 season.  In 1998, he was hired as the UCLA women's soccer coach and took the team to a 17–4–1 record.  In May 1999, he moved over to become the head coach of the men's program.  Over three seasons, he compiled a 43–17–4 but was forced to resign after the university discovered that he had not completed his undergraduate degree.

References

External links
 NASL stats
 UCLA Bruins coaching profile

1962 births
Living people
American soccer coaches
American soccer players
California Kickers players
Fort Lauderdale Sun players
Los Angeles Aztecs players
Los Angeles Heat players
College women's soccer coaches in the United States
North American Soccer League (1968–1984) indoor players
North American Soccer League (1968–1984) players
Parade High School All-Americans (boys' soccer)
San Jose Earthquakes (1974–1988) players
Tulsa Roughnecks (1978–1984) players
UCLA Bruins men's soccer coaches
United Soccer League (1984–85) players
Western Soccer Alliance players
Sportspeople from Redondo Beach, California
United States men's under-20 international soccer players
Soccer players from California
UCLA Bruins women's soccer coaches
Loyola Marymount Lions men's soccer coaches
Association football midfielders